Mirko Trosino (born 19 October 1992 in San Miniato) is an Italian road-racing cyclist.

Major results
2012
 1st Stage 7 Girobio
 3rd U23 National Time Trial Championships
 4th Memorial Elia Da Re
2017
 8th National Time Trial Championships
 2nd Overall Tour of China

References

1992 births
Living people
Italian male cyclists
People from San Miniato
Sportspeople from the Province of Pisa
Cyclists from Tuscany